Rhagastis albomarginatus is a moth of the family Sphingidae.

Distribution 
It is known from the Himalaya, China, Taiwan, Myanmar, Sumatra, Java and Borneo.

Description 
The forewing upperside has the first and third postmedian lines reduced to a series of prominent vein dots, the second postmedian line is very weak or absent, There is an inconspicuous and diffuse pale patch and a similar but less marked pale area. The pale band is reduced to an ill-defined patch near the anal angle. The fringe is weakly dentate with white with brown vein spots. The costal edge is at least partly creamy white. The hindwing underside has a small black discal spot.

Biology 
Larvae of subspecies R. a. dichroae have been recorded feeding on Vernicia montana and Dichroa febrifuga, while the larvae of subspecies R. a. albomarginatus feed on Dichroa, Hydrangea and Vitis species. The larva of the nominate subspecies are green marked with pale blue as early instars. The final instar has a pale blue head. The body is dorsally yellow, grading laterally to pale grass green or bluish green, the flanks of the abdomen are crossed by long, oblique, pale blue stripes. The thorax is longitudinally striped. The horn is dark blue.

Subspecies
Rhagastis albomarginatus albomarginatus (Himalaya, Taiwan, Myanmar)
Rhagastis albomarginatus dichroae Mell, 1922 (China)
Rhagastis albomarginatus everetti Rothschild & Jordan, 1903 (Indonesia, including Borneo and Sumatra)

References

Rhagastis
Moths described in 1894